The National Academy of Sciences (NAS) is a United States nonprofit, non-governmental organization. NAS is part of the National Academies of Sciences, Engineering, and Medicine, along with the National Academy of Engineering (NAE) and the National Academy of Medicine (NAM).

As a national academy, new members of the organization are elected annually by current members, based on their distinguished and continuing achievements in original research. Election to the National Academy is one of the highest honors in the scientific field. Members of the National Academy of Sciences serve pro bono as "advisers to the nation" on science, engineering, and medicine. The group holds a congressional charter under Title 36 of the United States Code.

Founded in 1863 as a result of an Act of Congress that was approved by Abraham Lincoln, the NAS is charged with "providing independent, objective advice to the nation on matters related to science and technology. ... to provide scientific advice to the government 'whenever called upon' by any government department."

The Academy receives no compensation from the government for its services.

Overview
, the National Academy of Sciences includes 2,493 NAS members and 491 international members. It employed about 1,100 staff in 2005. Some 190 members have won a Nobel Prize.  By its own admission in 1989, the addition of women to the Academy "continues at a dismal trickle", at which time there were 1,516 male members and 57 female members.

The National Academy of Sciences is one of the 135 member organizations of the International Science Council (ISC).   Although there is no formal relationship with state and local academies of science, there often is informal dialogue. The National Academy is governed by a 17-member Council, made up of five officers (president, vice president, home secretary, international secretary, and treasurer) and 12 Councilors, all of whom are elected from among the Academy membership.  Agencies of the United States government fund about 85 percent of the Academy's activities. Further funding comes from state governments, private foundations, and industrial organizations.

The Council has the ability ad-hoc to delegate certain tasks to committees. For example, the Committee on Animal Nutrition has produced a series of Nutrient requirements of domestic animals reports since at least 1944, each one being initiated by a different sub-committee of experts in the field for example on dairy cattle.

The National Academy of Sciences meets annually in Washington, D.C., which is documented in the Proceedings of the National Academy of Sciences (PNAS), its scholarly journal. The National Academies Press is the publisher for the National Academies, and makes more than 5,000 publications freely available on its website.

From 2004 to 2017, the National Academy of Sciences administered the Marian Koshland Science Museum to provide public exhibits and programming related to its policy work. The museum's exhibits focused on climate change and infectious disease. In 2017, the museum closed and made way for a new science outreach program called LabX.

Membership
The Academy currently has 2,984 members and international members. Existing members elect new members for life. Up to 120 members are elected every year; up to 30 foreign citizens may be elected as international members annually. The election process begins with a formal nomination, followed by a vetting period, and culminates in a final ballot at the Academy's annual meeting in April each year.  Members are affiliated with a section – a specific scientific field – in one of six so-called "classes": (1) Physical and Mathematical Sciences; (2) Biological Sciences; (3) Engineering and Applied Sciences; (4) Biomedical Sciences; (5) Behavioral and Social Sciences; and (6) Applied Biological, Agricultural, and Environmental Sciences. Since its founding, the Academy has elected 6,607 members. Harvard University is associated with the most members (330), some 5% of the all-time total.  The top ten institutions, half of which are in the Ivy League, account for nearly 28% of all members ever elected.

Facilities

The National Academy of Sciences maintains multiple buildings around the United States.

The National Academy of Sciences Building is located at 2101 Constitution Avenue, in northwest Washington, D.C.; it sits on the National Mall, adjacent to the Marriner S. Eccles Federal Reserve Board Building and in front of the headquarters of the U.S. State Department. The building has a neoclassical architectural style and was built by architect Bertram Grosvenor Goodhue. The building was dedicated in 1924 and is listed on the National Register of Historic Places. Goodhue engaged a team of artists and architectural sculptors including Albert Herter, Lee Lawrie, and Hildreth Meière to design interior embellishments celebrating the history and significance of science. The building is used for lectures, symposia, exhibitions, and concerts, in addition to annual meetings of the NAS, NAE, and NAM. The 2012 Presidential Award for Math and Science Teaching ceremony was held here on March 5, 2014. Approximately 150 staff members work at the NAS Building. In June 2012, it reopened to visitors after a major two-year restoration project which restored and improved the building's historic spaces, increased accessibility, and brought the building's aging infrastructure and facilities up to date.

More than 1,000 National Academies staff members work at The Keck Center of the National Academies at 500 Fifth Street in northwest Washington, D.C. The Keck Center provides meeting space and houses the National Academies Press Bookstore. The Marian Koshland Science Museum of the National Academy of Sciences – formerly located at 525 E St., N.W. – hosted visits from the public, school field trips, traveling exhibits such as Mathemalchemy, and permanent science exhibits.

The NAS also maintains conference centers in California and Massachusetts. The Arnold and Mabel Beckman Center is located on 100 Academy Drive in Irvine, California, near the campus of the University of California, Irvine; it offers a conference center and houses several NAS programs. The J. Erik Jonsson Conference Center located at 314 Quissett Avenue in Woods Hole, Massachusetts, is another conference facility.

History
The Act of Incorporation, signed by President Abraham Lincoln on March 3, 1863, created the National Academy of Sciences and named 50 charter members. Many of the original NAS members came from the so-called "Scientific Lazzaroni," an informal network of mostly physical scientists working in the vicinity of Cambridge, Massachusetts (c. 1850).

In 1863, the organizers enlisted the support of Alexander Dallas Bache, and also Charles Henry Davis, a professional astronomer who had been recently recalled from the Navy to Washington to head the Bureau of Navigation. They also elicited support from Swiss-American geologist Louis Agassiz and American mathematician  Peirce, who together planned the steps whereby the National Academy of Sciences was to be established. Senator Henry Wilson of Massachusetts was to name Agassiz to the Board of Regents of the Smithsonian Institution.

Agassiz was to come to Washington at the government's expense to plan the organization with the others. This bypassed Joseph Henry, who was reluctant to have a bill for such an academy presented to Congress. This was in the belief that such a resolution would be "opposed as something at variance with our democratic institutions". Nevertheless, Henry soon became the second President of NAS. Agassiz, Davis, Peirce, Benjamin Gould, and Senator Wilson met at Bache's house and "hurriedly wrote the bill incorporating the Academy, including in it the name of fifty incorporators".

During the last hours of the session, when the Senate was immersed in the rush of last minute business before its adjournment, Senator Wilson introduced the bill. Without examining it or debating its provisions, both the Senate and House approved it, and President Lincoln signed it.

Although hailed as a great step forward in government recognition of the role of science in American society, at the time, the National Academy of Sciences created enormous ill-feelings among scientists, whether or not they were named as incorporators.

The act states:[T]he Academy shall, whenever called upon by any department of the Government, investigate, examine, experiment, and report upon any subject of science or art, the actual expense of such investigations, examinations, experiments, and reports to be paid from appropriations which may be made for the purpose, but the Academy shall receive no compensation whatever for any services to the Government of the United States.The National Academies did not solve the problems facing a nation in Civil War as the Lazzaroni had hoped, nor did it centralize American scientific efforts.  However, election to the National Academy did come to be considered "the pinnacle of scientific achievement for Americans" until the establishment of the Nobel Prize at the end of the 19th century.

In 1870, the congressional charter was amended to remove the limitation on the number of members.

In 2013, astrophysicist Neil deGrasse Tyson was asked to write a speech for the 150th anniversary of the Gettysburg Address in which he made the point that one of Lincoln's greatest legacies was establishing the National Academy of Sciences in that same year, which had the long-term effect of "setting our Nation on a course of scientifically enlightened governance, without which we all may perish from this Earth".

Presidents
The president is the head of the Academy, elected by a majority vote of the membership to serve in this position for a term to be determined by the governing Council, not to exceed six years, and may be re-elected for a second term. The Academy has had 22 presidents since its foundation. The current president is geophysicist Marcia K. McNutt, the first woman to hold this position. Her term expires on June 30, 2022.

 1863–1867 Alexander Dallas Bache
 1868–1878 Joseph Henry
 1879–1882 William Barton Rogers
 1883–1895 Othniel Charles Marsh
 1895–1900 Wolcott Gibbs
 1901–1907 Alexander Agassiz
 1907–1913 Ira Remsen
 1913–1917 William Henry Welch
 1917–1923 Charles Doolittle Walcott
 1923–1927 Albert Abraham Michelson
 1927–1931 Thomas Hunt Morgan
 1931–1935 William Wallace Campbell
 1935–1939 Frank Rattray Lillie
 1939–1947 Frank Baldwin Jewett
 1947–1950 Alfred Newton Richards
 1950–1962 Detlev Wulf Bronk
 1962–1969 Frederick Seitz
 1969–1981 Philip Handler
 1981–1993 Frank Press
 1993–2005 Bruce Michael Alberts
 2005–2016 Ralph J. Cicerone
 2016–present Marcia McNutt

Awards
The Academy gives a number of different awards:
 General
 Membership of the National Academy of Sciences (including international members)
 John J. Carty Award for the Advancement of Science
 William O. Baker Award for Initiatives in Research, formerly NAS Award for Initiatives in Research
 NAS Award for Scientific Reviewing
 NAS Award for Scientific Discovery
 Public Welfare Medal
 Raymond and Beverly Sackler Prize in Convergence Research
 Astronomy/Astrophysics
 Henry Draper Medal
 J. Lawrence Smith Medal
 James Craig Watson Medal
 Behavioral/Social Sciences
 Atkinson Prize in Psychological and Cognitive Sciences
 William and Katherine Estes Award, formerly the NAS Award for Behavioral Research Relevant to the Prevention of Nuclear War
 Troland Research Awards
 Biology and Medicine
 Alexander Hollaender Award in Biophysics
 Jessie Stevenson Kovalenko Medal
 Richard Lounsbery Award
 Gilbert Morgan Smith Medal
 NAS Award in Molecular Biology
 NAS Award in the Neurosciences
 Pradel Research Award
 Selman A. Waksman Award in Microbiology
 Chemistry
 NAS Award in Chemical Sciences
 NAS Award for Chemistry in Service to Society
 Earth and Environmental Sciences
 Alexander Agassiz Medal
 Arthur L. Day Prize and Lectureship
 Daniel Giraud Elliot Medal
 Mary Clark Thompson Medal
 NAS Award in Early Earth and Life Sciences
 Charles Doolittle Walcott Medal, part of the NAS Award in Early Earth and Life Sciences since 2008
 Stanley Miller Medal, part of the NAS Award in Early Earth and Life Sciences since 2008
 G. K. Warren Prize
 Engineering and Applied Sciences
 J.C. Hunsaker Award – aeronautical engineering
 Gibbs Brothers Medal – naval architecture, marine engineering
 NAS Award for the Industrial Application of Science
 NAS Prize in Food and Agriculture Science
 Mathematics and Computer Science
 NAS Award in Mathematics
 Physics
 Arctowski Medal
 Comstock Prize in Physics
 Alexander Hollaender Award in Biophysics

Joint Declaration on Global Warming
In 2005, the national science academies of the G8 forum (including the National Academy of Sciences) and science academies of Brazil, China, and India (three of the largest emitters of greenhouse gases in the developing world) signed a statement on the global response to climate change. The statement stresses that the scientific understanding of climate change had become sufficiently clear to justify nations taking prompt action.

On May 7, 2010, a letter signed by 255 Academy members was published in Science magazine, decrying "political assaults" against climate change scientists. This was in response to a civil investigative demand on the University of Virginia (UVA) by Virginia Attorney General Ken Cuccinelli, seeking a broad range of documents from Michael E. Mann, a former UVA professor from 1999–2005. Mann, who currently works at Penn State, is a climate change researcher, and Cuccinelli alleges that Mann may have defrauded Virginia taxpayers in the course of his environmental research. Investigations had cleared Mann of charges that he falsified or suppressed data.

See also
 American Academy of Arts and Sciences
 National Digital Library Program (NDLP)
 List of members of the National Academy of Sciences
 National Digital Information Infrastructure and Preservation Program (NDIIPP)
 National Science Foundation (NSF)
 National Academy of Sciences' Board on Science, Technology, and Economic Policy
 National Academy of Sciences Biographical Memoirs
 National Academies of Sciences, Engineering, and Medicine
 Astronomy and Astrophysics Decadal Survey

Notable appointments
 1873, Edward C. Pickering (1846–1919) was the youngest scientist elected
 1924, Florence R. Sabin (1871–1953) was the first lifetime woman member to be elected
 1965, David Blackwell (1919–2010) was the first African-American elected
 2013, Ben Barres (1954–2017) was the first openly transgender scientist elected

References

Further reading

External links

 
 Office of Cultural Programs
 LabX
 The Science & Entertainment Exchange
 Library of Congress:
 LC 21: A Digital Strategy for the LOC
 Digital Collections and Programs
 Digital Information Infrastructure and Preservation Program
 Vega Science Trust:
 Video programmes
 

 01
Scientific organizations based in the United States
United States National Academies
United States
Library of Congress
Members of the International Council for Science
Scientific organizations established in 1863
1863 establishments in Washington, D.C.
Patriotic and national organizations chartered by the United States Congress
Buildings and structures on the National Register of Historic Places in Washington, D.C.
Neoclassical architecture in Washington, D.C.
Members of the International Science Council